Armando Martínez may refer to:

Armando Martínez (boxer) (born 1961), Cuban boxer
Armando Martínez (cyclist) (1931–1969), Mexican cyclist
Armando Martinez (Texas politician) (born 1976), American politician in Texas
Armando Martínez, baptismal name of Alejandro Máynez (born 1970s), Mexican serial killer
Armando Quintero Martínez (born 1954), Mexican politician

See also
Martínez (surname)